Erich Bruckmann was a boat builder and founder of Bruckmann Manufacturing, one of four companies that in 1969 formed C&C Yachts, a Canadian yacht builder that dominated North American sailing in the 1970s and early 1980s.

Erich Bruckmann built the revolutionary racing yacht Red Jacket which featured a first in sailboat construction - an extremely light weight balsa core - which allowed the vessel to compete and win. Red Jacket won 11 of 13 races in her first season, including the Charles Freeman Cup and the Lake Ontario International. In the 1967 Southern Ocean Racing Conference (SORC) race from St. Petersburg to Venice in Florida, Red Jacket finished first. It was the first Canadian boat to win against a fleet of about 85 others, many being the best U.S. racers.

Early life
Erich Bruckmann was born in Düsseldorf, Germany in 1930. The only child of Klara and Ludwig, he suffered from tuberculosis, an ailment that relapsed late in his life. Bruckmann at times spoke about his difficult youth in war-torn Germany. After the Second World War ended and his health returned, he became an active youth, playing soccer and cycling. He met his future wife, Lisa (briefly) on a bicycle tour around Germany and, despite the brevity of the meeting, sent her a postcard from every subsequent destination.

Bruckmann left Germany as a young man in 1956 to start a new life in Canada.

Education
Bruckmann was trained as a cabinetmaker and master carpenter in his native Germany.

Career
Bruckmann arrived in Oakville, Ontario from Germany in 1956, speaking no English and with little other than his carpentry tools, hoping to bring his wife and first-born son to Canada as soon as possible. His first years in Ontario after arriving were difficult. He showed up for his first job in the boat-building trade with no references and little English but with a toolbox of his own construction – the meticulously organized and crafted box served as his best reference. Bruckmann was hired by Metro Marine in Bronte, Ontario, working for Harry D. Greb, building and repairing wooden boats, working with Jan Gudgeon and Vic Carpenter. Metro Marine had evolved into a first-class yacht yard under the direction of John “Johnnie” Walker and, after a short time, Erik Bruckmann was made Shop Superintendent. While at Metro Marine Bruckman oversaw the construction of several Cuthbertson & Cassian designs, including the 38-foot La Mouette, a wooden design built for Gord Fisher of the Royal Canadian Yacht Club, which led to a semi-production series.

In 1962 Bruckmann left Metro Marine in Bronte to found his own cabinetmaking business, ostensibly to build kitchen cabinets and counters, but he had undertaken several yacht jobs, including completion of a Canadian Northern CN35 from a Cuthbertson & Cassian design. His skills had become known and appreciated.

Bruckmann Manufacturing
Erich Bruckmann began Bruckmann Manufacturing on Maple Avenue in Burlington, Ontario. He later set up shop on Wallace Road in the Speers Road and Third Line area of Oakville, Ontario, still as Bruckmann Mfg.

Red Jacket (1964)
Canadian yachtsman Perry Connolly asked George Cuthbertson of Cuthbertson & Cassian to design a custom  racing sloop for him. The design directive called for flat-out speed. Connolly said he wanted "the meanest, hungriest 40-footer afloat".

As a result of a connection through his earlier relationship with Metro Marine, Bruckmann was asked to build this new boat, named  Red Jacket, from the design by Cuthbertson. Starting in 1963 and through 1964 Red Jacket, was built by Erich Bruckmann at Bruckmann Manufacturing in fiberglass with a balsa core, the resulting structure was strong, stiff and significantly lighter than the wood or solid fiberglass yachts then sailing. Red Jacket is considered to be the first sailboat engineered with a cored hull (other earlier boats had balsa-cored decks and powerboat builders were then using it in transoms and superstructures). No doubt the weight savings and panel stiffness of her cored hull contributed significantly to her racing success. She was launched in May 1966 and took 11 of 13 starts that summer. That winter, Red Jacket headed south and won the famed SORC (Southern Ocean Racing Conference), also called "the circuit," which was a series of six races with the major two being from St. Petersburg to Fort Lauderdale and from Miami to Nassau, competing against over 85 of the best racers of the day. Red Jacket was the first Canadian boat to win the SORC. She is still actively raced by her owners, members the Royal Canadian Yacht Club.

C&C Yachts Ltd.
That victory was quickly followed by a successful defence of the Canada’s Cup with Manitou in 1969. This racing success resulted in the formation of C&C Yachts in the same year with the amalgamation of the design firm and the three builders producing Cuthbertson & Cassian designs.

In September 1969 the design firm of Cuthbertson & Cassian Ltd. joined with Belleville Marine Yard, Hinterhoeller Ltd. and Bruckmann Manufacturing to form C&C Yachts. In that first year C&C achieved sales of $3.9 million.

C&C Custom Division
As a result of this merger, Bruckmann’s Oakville plant became part of C&C Yachts, operating as the C&C Custom Yachts Division with Erich Bruckmann assuming responsibility for custom manufacturing and mold development.  During that time, C&C Custom Yachts built some 200 custom and semi-custom boats, including many renowned racing and cruising yachts.

Under Bruckmann the Custom Shop built such Cuthbertson & Cassian designs as the Redline 41, C&C 43-1, C&C 50, and the successful C&C 61. The Redline 41 Condor would follow Red Jacket's lead and win SORC overall in 1971. In the year of the merger Erich Bruckmann's custom shop was doing well financially. In 1966-67, meticulous craftsmanship had seen only three yachts completed; an ongoing expansion increased its output of semi-custom yachts alone to 62 annually.

The high water mark of the Custom Division career was the 1971 SORC where Cuthbertson & Cassian designed boats not only won overall, but also won three of the five divisions. A truly remarkable feat, which has never been achieved by another designer.

Evergreen (1977)
The ground breaking yacht Evergreen, Canada's Cup winner and Fastnet survivor, was perhaps Bruckmann's most recognized achievement.

The Canada's Cup winner in 1978 was a C&C design, the Two Ton class Evergreen, owned by Don Green with Hans Fogh at the helm. The design was a radical, dinghy-like, 41-foot boat, designed with the aim of winning the trophy as the C&C design team had exploited loopholes in the regatta rules. As one example, the galley was required to have sink but, in order to save weight, it had no drain, which the rule makers had not thought to specify. The deck hatches opened inward, which could be a safety hazard if they gave way during a capsize or broach, and the Evergreen crew faced protests over this defect in both the SORC and in the Canada's Cup. Upon reflection over the 1979 Fastnet race in which he participated but prudently DNF'ed, Skipper Green later said that Evergreen "never should have gone to England" for the Admiral's Cup, which is the destination of most Canada's Cup winners. Canadian Yachting magazine stated fifteen years later that "few yachts have created more controversy than" Evergreen, and that "its extreme design and controversial features ruffled feathers around the world." After the competition that year, the rule books were rewritten to preclude safety problems like those raised by the design of Evergreen, and as a result, C&C never received another commission for a Canada's Cup yacht.

Archangel (1980)

The C&C Custom 67 is a Canadian sailboat, that was designed by Robert W. Ball of C&C Yachts and was launched and named Archangel in September 1980.

The boat was built by Bruckmann and his crew at the C&C Yachts Custom Division in Oakville. She remains the largest pleasureboat commission ever received by C&C, and was an enormous project: six months in design and 14 months in construction. Only one example was completed.

Retirement
After his retirement in 1984 Bruckmann did some consulting work for C&C Yachts in Niagara-on-the-Lake. He was a hands-on man, a hiker of the Alps and daily frequenter of the YMCA who could not bear to be inactive. He once re-shingled a backyard shed the day after a major operation. He would go from watching European soccer matches to listening to Beethoven and Strauss. His subscription to The Economist and wide (always non-fiction) reading bolstered his strong opinions on politics and history. But he could be a careful listener, too. Erich made much of the teak modernist furniture in the home he shared with Lisa, his beloved wife of 58 years and the mother of his five children.

In 1986 Bruckmann's son Mark decided to reinvent Bruckmann Manufacturing. Mark Bruckmann reopened the company in the former Metro Marine building - the same place where his father started so many years before, and Erich Bruckmann helped Mark to re-establish in 1986.

Death
Erich Bruckmann died 28 October 2011 at Joseph Brant Memorial Hospital in Burlington, Ontario, of tuberculosis, surrounded by his family. He was 81.

Awards
Erich Bruckmann was awarded the Canadian Yachting Magazine, Ontario Sailing, 2011 Legends of Ontario Sailing Award as one of the “Builders of C&C Yachts”

See also 
 List of sailboat designers and manufacturers

References

External links
 Photographs of Red Jacket's Construction
 Launching of "La Mouette", 1961 Launching of Gordon Fisher's C&C designed, Erik Bruckmann built, wooden 38' sloop.  Constructed at Metro Marine during the winter of 1960-1961, launched spring of 1961. A close up of Erich Bruckmann is at 4:53

Canadian boat builders
1930 births
2011 deaths
C&C Yachts